Malankattu is a 1980 Indian Malayalam film,  directed by Ramu Kariat. The film stars Babu, Prathima and Shyamal Rao in the lead roles. The film has musical score by K. Raghavan.

Cast
Babu
Prathima
Shyamal Rao

Soundtrack
The music was composed by K. Raghavan and the lyrics were written by Poovachal Khader.

References

External links
 

1980 films
1980s Malayalam-language films
Films directed by Ramu Kariat